In video production, a promotional video is marketing or advertising:

Arts, media and entertainment
 Promotional recording, an audio or video recording distributed to publicize a recording
 Trailer (promotion), a commercial advertisement for a feature film
 Music video, a short film that integrates a song with imagery

Corporate use
 Corporate video, non-advertisement media created for and commissioned by an organization

Personal use
 Video resume, a recording used to promote a jobseeker
 Promotional dating video, a video dating recording made to find a romantic partner

References

Video